The women's 4 × 100 metres relay competition at the 2016 Summer Olympics in Rio de Janeiro, Brazil was held at the Estádio Olímpico João Havelange on 18–19 August.

Summary
The United States entered as the defending Olympic champions, having set new world and Olympic records at the 2012 London Olympics. Jamaica were the reigning world champions from 2015, having defeated the Americans there. Germany had the fastest time of the year before the event (41.62 seconds) and the other main medal contenders included Great Britain and Netherlands (all three made the 2016 European podium).

During the second heat the United States missed their second handover which was caused by Kauiza Venancio of the Brazilian team bumping Allyson Felix as she approached the handoff to English Gardner. The American appeal was upheld, and they were given a second chance to qualify for the final, which the United States team accomplished with the fastest qualifying time of 41.77.

There was no further plot twist in the final. Even though the United States were along the curb in the less advantageous lane 1, Tianna Bartoletta shot out to the lead around the first turn, making up the stagger on Canada's Farah Jacques before the halfway point in the turn. It was a clean, unobstructed pass to Allyson Felix because Canada was still waiting for the incoming runner to arrive. Felix pulled away down the backstretch, with Jamaica's double sprint gold medalist Elaine Thompson separating from the rest of the field. As English Gardner ran a great turn, USA passed Germany in lane 4, while Jamaica was just about to make up the stagger on Trinidad and Tobago to their immediate outside. By the time Gardner handed off to Tori Bowie, the USA had a 3-metre lead over Jamaica, Great Britain just ahead of Trinidad and Tobago racing for bronze. On the run in, Bowie lost some ground on the lead over Jamaica's two time Olympic gold medalist Shelly-Ann Fraser-Pryce, but still held a comfortable lead, as Great Britain's Daryll Neita separated from Trinidad and Tobago's Khalifa St. Fort, who was also caught by Germany's Rebekka Haase before the line.

The British team claimed their national record.  USA ran the second fastest time in history (only behind their own world record four years earlier). Jamaica ran the fifth fastest time in history.

The following evening the medals were presented by Adam Pengilly, IOC member, Great Brittan and Víctor López, Council Member of the IAAF.

Records
Prior to the competition, the existing World and Olympic records were as follows.

The following national records were established during the competition:

Schedule
All times are Brazil time (UTC−3)

Results

Round 1
Qualification rule: first 3 of each heat (Q) plus the 2 fastest times (q) qualified.

Heat 1

Heat 2

Special Heat 3

Final

Notes

References

Women's 4 x 100 metres relay
Relay foot races at the Olympics
Olympics 2016
2016 in women's athletics
Women's events at the 2016 Summer Olympics